Edmund Downing (c. 1530 - 1596?), of White Friars, London and Hendon, Middlesex, was an English Member of Parliament.

He was a Member (MP) of the Parliament of England for Higham Ferrers in 1572.

References

1530 births
1596 deaths
Year of birth uncertain
Year of death uncertain
16th-century English people
People of the Tudor period
People from London
People from Middlesex
Members of the Parliament of England (pre-1707)